Isongole is an administrative ward in Rungwe District, Mbeya Region, Tanzania. In 2016 the Tanzania National Bureau of Statistics report there were 7,930 people in the ward, from 18,689 in 2012 before it was split up.

Villages and hamlets 
The ward has 6 villages, and 22 hamlets.

 Idweli
 Ijela
 Itenki
 Iwawa
 Katumba
 Sogeza
 Isyonje
 Isyonje A
 Isyonje B
 Kenya
 Mbwiga
 Mbeye 1
 Nyaga
 Tembela
 Ndwati
 Bwawani
 Igalula
 Ndowela
 Ngumbulu
 Ikambaku
 Ipyela A
 Ipyela B
 Muungano
 Nsanga
 Unyamwanga
 Nguga
 Shoga
 Uholo

References 

Wards of Mbeya Region
Rungwe District
Constituencies of Tanzania